Dan Pearson may refer to:

Dan Pearson, bassist for American Music Club
Dan Pearson (garden designer) (born 1964), English garden designer

See also
Danny Pearson (disambiguation)
Daniel Pearson (disambiguation)